Milenka Subić is a politician in Serbia. She has served in the National Assembly of Serbia since 2020 as a member of the Serbian Progressive Party.

Private career
Subić was born in Šid, Vojvodina, in what was then the Socialist Republic of Serbia in the Socialist Federal Republic of Yugoslavia. She holds a bachelor's degree in economics. In 2018, she was appointed to a municipal committee in Šid on the evaluation of projects in the field of public information. She has also served as co-ordinator for Roma issues in the municipality.

Politician
Subić is a member of the Progressive Party's board in Šid. She received the 145th position on the party's Aleksandar Vučić — For Our Children electoral list in the 2020 Serbian parliamentary election and was elected to the national assembly when the list won a landslide majority with 188 out of 250 mandates. She is now a member of the assembly committee on labour, social issues, social inclusion, and poverty reduction; a deputy member of the committee on finance, state budget, and control of public spending; a deputy member of the agriculture, forestry, and water management committee; and a member of Serbia's parliamentary friendship groups with Bosnia and Herzegovina, China, Croatia, Cyprus, Greece, Ireland, Italy, North Macedonia, Poland, Portugal, Russia, and Turkey.

References

1970 births
Living people
People from Šid
Members of the National Assembly (Serbia)
Serbian Progressive Party politicians
Women members of the National Assembly (Serbia)